Running Fence was an installation art piece by Christo and Jeanne-Claude, which was completed on September 10, 1976.  The art installation was first conceived in 1972, but the actual project took more than four years to plan and build. After it was installed, the builders removed it 14 days later, leaving no visible trace behind.

Installation 
The cables were supported by 2,050 steel poles (each: 6.4 meters / 21 feet long or 9 centimeters / 3.5 inches in diameter) embedded 1 meter (3 feet) into the ground, braced by steel guy wires (145 kilometers / 90 miles of steel cable), 14,000 earth anchors, and without any concrete.

The route of the fence began near U.S. Highway 101 and crossed 14 roads and the private property of 59 ranchers to reach the Pacific Ocean near Bodega Bay. The art project required 42 months of collaborative efforts, 18 public hearings, 3 sessions at the Superior Courts of California, and the drafting of an Environmental Impact Report (EIR); the required EIR for the piece was 450 pages long.

All expenses for the temporary work of art were paid by Christo and Jeanne-Claude through the sale of studies, preparatory drawings and collages, scale models and original lithographs.

The piece is said to have been partly inspired by fences demarcating the Continental Divide in Colorado.

Legacy
The piece is commemorated by historic markers at Watson School near Bodega, California and at State Route 1 in Valley Ford, California.  In December 1976, the County Landmarks Commission, County of Sonoma designated the Valley Ford site (pole #7-33) as History Landmark #24.

The largest remaining intact and continuous section of the Running Fence hangs below the ceiling of the Rio Theater in Monte Rio, California.

Between April 1, 2010 through September 25, 2010, Christo and Jeanne-Claude: Remembering the Running Fence was on display at the Smithsonian American Art Museum. The exhibition comprised over 350 archival and related works and photographs, and visitors could touch the actual nylon fabric panels and steel poles from the original work of art.

Documentary
The piece was the subject of a 1978 documentary film Running Fence by Albert and David Maysles. The film includes scenes showing the local response to the project, which ranged from excitement to resentment and active protest. Several Californians including Expressionist painter Byron Randall protested the piece on the grounds of both land infringement and lack of artistic merit; however others appreciated the beauty of the work and in the end the project was completed.

Gallery

See also
Site-specific art
Land art
Public art
List of Sonoma County Regional Parks facilities
Sonoma County Historic Landmarks and Districts

References

Further reading

External links

Christo and Jeanne-Claude: Running Fence
Photo of Running Fence section in Rio Theater auditorium
Gallery of 24 historic photos from the Santa Rosa Press-Democrat newspaper archives

Installation art works
Outdoor sculptures in California
1976 sculptures
History of Sonoma County, California
History of the San Francisco Bay Area
History of Marin County, California
Parks in Sonoma County, California
West Marin
Fabric sculptures
Art in the San Francisco Bay Area
Works by Christo and Jeanne-Claude